Forgotten Songs is a public artwork by Michael Thomas Hill located in Angel Place, Sydney. The installation was part of the 2009 Sydney Laneway Temporary art scheme, afterwards, due to the popularity of the installation, in 2011, the project was turned into a part of the 9 million dollar permanent laneway installations.

The Laneway temporary art program ran between 2008 and 2013 with the main goal of laneways activation, innovation stimulation in the city and, in general, injecting new energy into the urban life. The program consisted of two stages. Forgotten Songs artwork was a part of the second Laneways program titled By George! Hidden Networks. The principal aim was to address two key issues of urban renewal in city's lanes and climate change. Other than Forgotten Songs installation, seven other artworks participated in this stage.

Artwork concept 

The artwork concept could be comprehended by the artist's words: "The installation explores how Sydney’s fauna has evolved and adapted to co-exist with increased urbanisation – inviting contemplation of the city’s past, its underlying landscape, and the sustainability issues associated with increased urban development."

Title 
As a result, the artwork's title was selected to celebrate those birds which were living in central Sydney "before they were gradually forced out of the city by European settlement". The artist's intention was to return the birds' sounds to the city and make them an important part of city life.

Installation

Birdcages 
The artist has used 120 suspended bird cages in the laneway above the Angel Place accompanied by the sound recordings of extinct or threatened bird species of the central Sydney.

Bird songs 
Recordings are played of the songs of fifty bird species which used to live in the central Sydney area on two audio tracks - day birds and night birds - with "a calendared sequence of triggers that progressively allows for longer days in summer and longer nights in winter". Some of these birds songs can still be heard on the city margins but not in central Sydney. Based on investigations of doctor Richard Major in regards to the city soil types and examining Australian Museum collection of bird skins, a list of 50 species of both diurnal and nocturnal birds was provided. Consequently, the sound files of  those 50 species were gathered by the wildlife recordist, Fred van Gessel.

Practical development of the project 

In terms of the practical aspect of the project, about 120 birdcages sources from various places, from eBay to second-hand stores. And the artist claims that in order to get all those birdcages, his mother, sister and his relatives have been involved in collecting and picking those cages. Sound installations have been done by putting all-weather speakers in some of the birdcages, which they continually play birdsongs.

Birds species 
In addition to hearing the fifty birds' songs as you walk on the Angel Place, names of these fifty bird species can be read as well, since they have been installed into the ground as the part of the installation. The following list represents the bird species which sang in central Sydney. Some of these songs still can be heard in city margins, if these birds can find food to survive.

 Barn owl
 Brown gerygone
 Brown thornbill
 Brown-headed honeyeater
 Brush cuckoo
 Dollarbird
 Dusky woodswallow
 Eastern spinebill
 Eastern whipbird
 Eastern yellow robin
 Fan-tailed cuckoo
 Australian golden whistler
 Grey fantail
 Grey shrikethrush 
 Jacky winter
 Leaden flycatcher
 Little lorikeet
 Mistletoebird
 Owlet-nightjar
 Pallid cuckoo 
 Powerful owl
 Red-browed finch
 Regent honeyeater
 Rockwarbler 
 Rufous whistler 
 Scarlet Honeyeater
 Scarlet robin
 Shining bronze cuckoo
 Southern boobook
 Southern emu-wren
 Spotted pardalote
 Spotted quail-thrush
 Striated thornbill
 Superb fairywren
 Superb lyrebird
 Tawny frogmouth
 Tawny-crowned honeyeater
 Varied sittella
 Variegated fairywren
 Whistling kite
 White-throated gerygone
 White-browed scrubwren
 White-browed woodswallow
 White-eared honeyeater
 White-naped honeyeater
 White-throated nightjar
 White-throated treecreeper
 Wonga Pigeon
 Yellow-tufted honeyeater
 Yellow-faced honeyeater

Based on the bird species, some of them used to sing during the daytime, while some others during the nighttime. Therefore, song recordings change from day to night. At night, Powerful owl, Southern boobook, Tawny frogmouth, Barn owl, Owlet-nightjar and White-throated nightjar songs might be heard.

Design team 
Forgotten Songs was the outcome of an interdisciplinary project, including Michael Thomas Hill as the artist, Dr Richard Major as  the senior research scientist, Fred Van Gessel as the wildlife recordist, Lightwell as the audio system designer and programmer, Freeman Ryan Design as Graphic Design office and Aspect Studio as Landscape Architecture company. all those groups and individuals have been involved in delivering this artwork installation.

See also 

 List of public art in the City of Sydney
 City Recital Hall
List of endemic birds of Australia
 Lanes and alleyways of Sydney

References

External links 
 Forgotten Songs at City Art Sydney
 Michael Thomas Hill at Sydney Oral Histories (recording, transcript)
 Forgotten Songs at MichaelThomasHill.com

Public art in Sydney
Birds in art
2009 works
2011 works